Glass Tiger is a Grammy Award-nominated Canadian rock band from Newmarket, Ontario that formed in 1983. The band has released five studio albums. Its 1986 debut album, The Thin Red Line, went quadruple platinum in Canada and gold in the United States. Two singles from that album, "Don't Forget Me (When I'm Gone)" and "Someday", reached the U.S. Top 10.

History
In Newmarket, Ontario, vocalist Alan Frew and bassist Wayne Parker (both from local band Onyx), along with keyboardist Sam Reid (from River Drive Park band The End), were recruited by drummer Mike Hanson with the intention of forming a new band. At the time, Hanson was the lead singer and drummer of The End.  After The End disbanded the new partnership from the ashes of both bands successfully formed the band Tokyo; that band later developed into Glass Tiger in 1983. Guitarist Al Connelly joined the band in 1983.

In 1986, Glass Tiger released its first album, The Thin Red Line; it was produced by Jim Vallance (who co-wrote two songs) and Bryan Adams made a memorable vocal cameo on the lead single "Don't Forget Me (When I'm Gone)". This album went quadruple platinum in Canada and gold in the United States. Two of its songs, "Don't Forget Me (When I'm Gone)" and "Someday", reached the Top 10 in the U.S. charts. Glass Tiger won three 1986 Juno Awards: Album of the Year for The Thin Red Line, Single of the Year for "Don't Forget Me (When I'm Gone)", and Most Promising Group of the Year.  The album's producer, Jim Vallance, was named Composer of the Year. The band won two more Juno Awards in 1987 and was nominated for a Grammy Award for Best New Artist. The band performed in the United States as part of Journey’s Raised on Radio Tour and on Tina Turner's European Break Every Rule Tour.

The band released a second album, Diamond Sun, in 1988. The album was certified triple platinum in Canada and featured the single "I'm Still Searching", which peaked at #2 in Canada. Hanson left the band in 1988 following the release of Diamond Sun.

Glass Tiger's third album, Simple Mission, was released in 1991 by Capitol Records. The album received radio play in Canada and Europe. It was certified platinum in Canada.

The band went on hiatus in 1993. After pursuing other projects, the band reformed in 2003 with new drummer Christopher McNeil and began touring again.

In March 2009, Glass Tiger and members of the NHL alumni visited Canadian Forces stationed in Kandahar, Afghanistan.  The visit included live performances and footage was shown on an episode of Entertainment Tonight Canada.  The band returned to Afghanistan for a second performance in 2010.

In 2012, Glass Tiger toured across Canada with the band Roxette, and performed as part of Penticton, BC's "Rock The Peach Music Fest" On July 1, 2013, Glass Tiger performed a free concert in Leduc, Alberta as part of a Canada Day Celebration. Glass Tiger performed at a number of festivals in the summer of 2017. On September 23, 2017, Glass Tiger performed at Canada Games Plaza in Prince George, British Columbia. The free concert was held to thank the city for receiving over 11,000 evacuees from the southern interior who had been displaced by various wildfires.

In February 2018, to celebrate 31 years of making music together, the band released an album entitled 31. Produced by Scottish/Canadian country artist Johnny Reid, the album includes special guest contributions from Julian Lennon ("Thin Red Line"), Alan Doyle ("My Song"), Véronic DiCaire ("Someday") and Susan Aglukark and David R. Maracle ("Diamond Sun").

In May 2019, Glass Tiger released their fifth studio album, 33. Following the release of 33, the band joined Corey Hart on his Never Surrender cross-Canada tour in June 2019. The band continued to perform a number of headlining shows throughout the summer and performed as part of the Sopot International Song Festival in Poland.

Members
Current members
Al Connelly – guitar, backing vocals (1983–present)
Alan Frew – vocals, guitar, tambourine (1983–present)
Wayne Parker – bass, backing vocals (1983–present)
Sam Reid – keyboards, piano, backing vocals (1983–present)
Chris McNeill – drums (2003–present)
Tom Lewis - bass, backing vocals (2015–present)

Former members
Michael Hanson – drums, guitar, backing vocals (1983–1988)

Timeline

Discography

Studio albums

Live albums
Live (2006)

Compilation albums
Air Time: The Best of Glass Tiger (1993)
No Turning Back: 1985–2005 (2005)
Then, Now, Next (2012)

Singles

NB: "My Song" (1988) missed the Billboard Hot 100, but peaked at number 71 on the Cash Box Top 100 Singles chart.

NB: "Don't Forget Me" and "Someday" both reached the Billboard AC chart, peaking at #30 and #4 respectively.

Awards and nominations

Notes

References

External links
 Glass Tiger homepage
 Bio at CanadianBands.com CanConRox entry
 Canadian Pop Music Encyclopedia entry
 Glass Tiger in The Canadian Encyclopedia
 Photos from Glass Tiger's performance in Vancouver, 2008

Musical groups established in 1983
Juno Award for Single of the Year winners
Canadian pop rock music groups
Canadian new wave musical groups
Musical groups from Newmarket, Ontario
1983 establishments in Ontario
Capitol Records artists
Juno Award for Album of the Year winners
Juno Award for Breakthrough Group of the Year winners